The Chapel of the Virgen del Rosario is the chapel attached to the Church of Santo Domingo in the city of Puebla, Puebla, Mexico. Work of the 17th century, summit of the New Spanish Baroque, was described in its time as the Eighth Wonder of the World by Friar Diego de Gorozpe, in a print of 1690, regarded like this for a long time in New Spain, as well as La Casa de Oro (The Golden House) and Domus Aurea. It is one of the most prominent examples of the New Spanish Baroque and one of the greatest artistic-religious achievements in Mexico. It is a chapel full of symbolisms, where each element represents something related to the Catholicism and Dominican Order beliefs. It is located on pedestrian avenue 5 de Mayo number 407.

The building is part of the Historic Center of Puebla City, which was added to the UNESCO World Heritage List in 1987.

History

 
The order of the Our Lady of the Rosary was promoted by the Dominican Order, who dedicated in each of their convents a chapel to their devotion. In Mexico it was no exception when the first religious of the order arrived in 1526, but it was not until the year of 1531 when they began the construction of their first important church in Puebla, which is also dedicated to the Archangel Michael however the Chapel of the Rosario was conceived until 1650 and completed and consecrated on 16 April 1690.

It was the first in Mexico dedicated to the Our Lady of the Rosary. Its construction served a double purpose: to worship the Virgin and teach the faithful the prayer of the Holy Rosary. It was conceived by the Dominican Friar Juan de Cuenca, who in 1650 began its construction, but given the magnitude of the work, until 1690 it was completed by two other Dominicans Friar Agustín Hernández and Friar Diego de Gorozpe, who they dedicated the distinguished bishop of the Puebla of the Council of His Majesty Manuel Fernández de Santa Cruz, and celebrating its consecration on April 16, 1690, to coincide with the date on which the City of Puebla de los Ángeles was founded. The celebration lasted 8 days (La Octava), pronouncing in each of them a sermon, processions, masses and events turning it into a great stage of joy.

The determined impulse to the teaching of the Holy Rosary and the favorite devotion to the Virgin of Our Lady of the Rosary, which was given to them in the 17th century, explains the complexity of the great work, which as soon as it was finished and qualified as the Eighth Wonder of the World.

In 1971 a team of restaurateurs sponsored by the Mary Street Jenkins Foundation did a restoration work in the Chapel.

Architecture

This type of construction reflects the economic reach of the Church in those years and the ambition and sumptuousness with which its churches were planned and erected.

The plan is arranged in the shape of a Latin cross, with short sections and testero. The nave is divided into three sections and its vault is barrel with lunettes in the same way as the sections of the crossing, it has a narrow dome with tholobate and on this some windows and others in the semicircular dome, whose purpose is to give illumination to the sumptuous ciprés just down.

The interior of the chapel is majestic, where the architectural structures have been covered in every corner that is observed with reliefs in golden stucco, in order to exalt the religious feeling.

The lateral walls of the nave are symmetrically covered by large canvases by the painter José Rodríguez Carnero (1649-1725), with themes alluding to the Joys of the Virgin, the paintings are in the Chiaroscuro style that contrast with the bright and clear adorn the crossing, by the same author.

The lower part of the paintings is adorned with a lambrin of azulejos from Talavera pottery.

On the crossing there are other paintings with themes related also to the life of the Virgin, as well as another large one that crowns the apse of the chapel and is dedicated to the Glorification and Triumph of the Rosary. The reliefs that cover the walls, pilasters and vaults have motifs not only of the plant, animal or angelic order but also of the symbolic-religious order.

The Chapel is decorated with overgilded plasterwork, prepared with a base of flour with egg white and water (?) and covered with 24 carat gold leaves, like many Baroque decorations of the Pueblan capital.

On the altar stands the throne of the Virgin, with a baldachin carved by the Spanish master Lucas Pinto.

Portal
The access portal is in the left crossing of the church, and its austere Baroque design contrasts with the wealth of the interior. It has a cushioned rounded arches, as well as the decorated and the jambs, slightly trumpet-shaped and framed by tuscan pilasters and corinthian columns. Finish the arch something similar to a balcony with a window between pilasters.

Interior
The chapel is characterized by being of Latin cross plan with short sections and testeros. It is a dazzling example of the 17th century New Spanish Baroque style, and a stage for faith and fantasy, where each element has a precise meaning. In the vault the representations of the three theological virtues are immersed in the foliage: Faith, Hope and Charity. We find sixty angels placed around the circumference that forms the dome and the main vault, each in a different expression, some are only heads and/or others are full-body images. A detail to highlight is that in the area dedicated to the choir and the organ, we find angels that seem to be playing musical instruments and singing songs.

Dome

 (a) In the dome, the Divine Grace (Gratia Divina) carries in its hands the palm leaf that symbolizes martyrdom, and the laurel branch of victory. Grace, without which there is no valid virtue, represents the origin of everything divine on earth; it is accompanied with the gifts of the Holy Spirit:
 (b) Understanding (Spiritus Intellectus) 
 (c) Fortitude (Spiritus Fortitudinis) 
 (d) Piety (Spiritus Pietatis) 
 (e) Fear of God (Spiritus Timoris) 
 (f) Knowledge (Spiritus Scientiae) 
 (g) Counsel (Spiritus Consilii) and
 (h) Wisdom (Spirit Sapientiae), qualities represented by female figures. Through these symbols one learns that having faith, hope and charity, being in grace and receiving the essential gifts, one can reach the supreme wisdom, represented by the dove of the Holy Spirit, which in the dome is shown wrapped between clouds and rays.

In the dome there are also 16 saints: Saint Ursula (i), Agatha of Sicily (j), Agnes of Rome (k), Saint Anastasia (l), Saint Apollonia (m), Clare of Assisi (n), Gertrude the Great (o), Lutgardis (p), Saint Rosalia (q), Rose of Viterbo (r), Teresa of Ávila (s), Thecla (t), Saint Barbara (u), Saint Cecilia (v), Saint Lucy (w) y Catherine of Alexandria (x).

Paintings

On the sides of the nave six large canvases by the painter José Rodríguez Carnero are displayed, which allude to the Joys of the Virgin: the Assumption, the Visitation and the Nativity. In front of them on the left side of the nave: the Adoration, the presentation in the Temple and Jesus among the doctors, scenes that represent the key moments in the human and earthly life of Mary. The lower part of the walls is covered with a superb lambrin of Talavera pottery azulejos, in whose upper strip protruding heads of cherubim alternated with the Dominican coat of arms.

Crossing
Although their sections are very short they present the same lush decoration on the nave. On the left side you can see a painting of the Assumption of Mary next to estofado carvings of John the Apostle and Matthew the Apostle; above surrounded by flowers and foliage, Elizabeth and Saint Joseph. On the right section a painting with the Coronation of Mary and the figures of Mark the Evangelist and Luke the Evangelist are displayed; in the closing next to the window, one can see Joachim and Saint Anne. The tribute to the four evangelists is because they were the first to speak of the Virgin, whose family appears here surrounded by angels (praises), flowers ( offerings), birds (music) and pelicans (the symbol of Christ).

Apse
In it is a huge painting dedicated to the Glorification and Triumph of the Rosary, in which you can see the Virgin crowned with roses. Together with the paintings of the crossing, it constitutes a descriptive triptych of the celestial life of Mary, who after climbing to the Heavens and being crowned appears on earth to distribute the Rosary.

Altar

This place is reminiscent of the interrelation between religious architecture and its symbolisms: the square that forms on the crossing represents the earth, the octagonal base of the dome recreates the rebirth after death, and its perfect curvature represents the Celestial Vault, paradise symbol.

Ciprés

The ciprés under the drum dome that protects the Our Lady of the Rosary is made up of twelve Corinthian columns at the base made of marble from Tecali de Herrera, representing the apostles. In the first body some Dominican saints are appreciated, and in the second twelve beautiful solomonic columns covered with roses and lilies that frame Saint Dominic. The saints embedded in the roof niches hold flower clusters, four decorative ribs are embraced by plants and are arranged in the form of a vine. Also, there are mouldings with high reliefs of plants typical of the region, as if it were intended to remind us of the fertility and benefits of this land. There is even a small one that iconically represents the king star. In the top on the roof lantern, is Archangel Gabriel, a figure that tops this great Baroque work signed by Lucas Pinto.

Chorus
You can see here a relief in which there is a group of children with musical instruments, accompanied by angels and under the direction of God the Father.

Gallery

See also
Church of Santo Domingo, Puebla
Our Lady of the Rosary
List of buildings in Puebla City

Notes

References

External links

Roman Catholic churches in Puebla (city)
1531 establishments in New Spain
Roman Catholic churches completed in 1690
Chapels in Mexico
Historic centre of Puebla
Baroque church buildings in Puebla
Tourist attractions in Puebla
Dominican churches in Mexico
Azulejos in buildings in Mexico
17th-century Roman Catholic church buildings in Mexico